Palomani (possibly from Aymara, urpi, paluma dove, "the one with a dove (or doves)") is a mountain in the Apolobamba mountain range on the border of  Bolivia and Peru. On the Bolivian side it is located in the La Paz Department, Franz Tamayo Province, Pelechuco Municipality, and on the Peruvian side it lies in the Puno Region, Putina Province, Ananea District. It is situated north of Suches Lake. Palomani is south of Chaupi Orco (or Viscachani), Salluyu and Jichu Qullu, near Chocñacota in the west.

References 

Mountains of La Paz Department (Bolivia)
Mountains of Puno Region
International mountains of South America
Bolivia–Peru border
Mountains of Peru